Clara Jeanne Nuvoletti (née Agnelli), formerly Princess Clara von Fürstenberg (7 April 1920 – 19 July 2016), was an Italian socialite and heiress.

Early life and family 
Clara Jeanne Agnelli was born in Turin on 7 April 1920 to Edoardo Agnelli, a businessman and member of the Agnelli family, and Donna Virginia Bourbon del Monte, a noblewoman. Her paternal grandfather, Giovanni Agnelli, was the founder of Fiat S.p.A. Her maternal grandfather was Carlo Bourbon del Monte, Prince of San Faustino. She was the sister of Cristiana Brandolini d'Adda, Susanna Agnelli, Maria Sole Agnelli, Gianni Agnelli, Giorgio Agnelli, and Umberto Agnelli.

In 1935, when Agnelli was fifteen years old, her father died in an airplane crash. Her mother died in a car accident in 1945. In November 1968, Agnellli went to the break-away state of Biafra in Nigeria to give money to secessionist leader C. Odumegwu Ojukwu on behalf of her family.

Marriages 
Agnelli married Prince Tassilo zu Fürstenberg in 1938 when she was 18 years old. The couple had three children, Prince Egon von Fürstenberg, Princess Ira von Fürstenberg, and Prince Sebastien von Fürstenberg. During her marriage, Agnelli had an affair with Italian actor Giovanni Nuvoletti, Count Nuvoletti Perdomini, whom she had met in Sestriere when she was twelve years old. She ran off with Nuvoletti and the two were eventually arrested, as adultery was illegal in Italy at the time. She had to sign a legal document renouncing her relationship with Nuvoletti in return for an annuity. She continued on with the affair, which angered her brother Gianni Agnelli. Once divorce was legalized in Italy, Agnelli married Nuvoletti in 1974 in a civil ceremony and moved into the Villa Papadopoli. After the death of her first husband, she and Nuvoletti had a Catholic wedding ceremony at her villa's chapel in 1989.

Later life and death 
Agnelli published several cook books. Nuvoletti died in 2008.

Agnelli died on 19 July 2016 at the hospital dell'Angelo di Mestre. She had a Catholic funeral at the Church of Santa Maria del Carmello in Mestre. Her inheritance was worth €100 million.

References 

1920 births
2016 deaths
Clara
Bourbon del Monte family
Clara
German princesses
Italian socialites
Princesses by marriage
Nobility from Turin